Netta Garti (or Neta Garty; ; born 20 March 1980) is an Israeli actress.

Biography
Garti was born in and lives in Tel Aviv, Israel, to a Jewish family.

She played the role of Cookie in the Israeli television series The Arbitrator. She has twice received Awards of the Israeli Film Academy nominations; a 2004 'Best Actress' nomination for her role as Nicole Shushan in Turn Left at the End of the World, and a 2007 'Best Supporting Actress' nomination for her role as Young Rachel Brener in The Debt. She also had a starring role in the 2007 film Love Life directed by Maria Schrader.

She plays the wife of an Israeli undercover counterterrorism officer in the Israeli political thriller television series Fauda.

In 2021, she took part in the second season of The Singer in the Mask as the Oyster and was the fourteenth contestant eliminated.

Filmography
 (TV series) as Li
Turn Left at the End of the World (2004) as Nicole Shushan
 (2005) as Noga Kochavi
Love Life (2007) as Ya'ara
 (2007)
The Debt (2007) as young Rachel Brener
The Arbitrator (TV series) as Limor 'Cookie' Goldman
Fauda (TV series) as Gali Kabilio

References

External links

1980 births
Living people
Israeli Jews
Israeli television actresses
Israeli film actresses
People from Gedera
Israeli people of Bulgarian-Jewish descent
Israeli people of Polish-Jewish descent